Hejian Technology Corporation (in ) is China's second largest semiconductor foundry company after SMIC.

The company was founded in November 2001 and started production in 2003. They specialize in automotive, consumer, and industrial chips in the range of 0.5 micron to 110 nanometer. Hejian is located in Suzhou Industrial Park. They employ approximately 2,000 workers.

References
http://www.hjtc.com.cn/English/aboutHJ/aboutUs.asp

Foundry semiconductor companies
Semiconductor companies of China
Manufacturing companies based in Suzhou
Suzhou Industrial Park
Computer companies established in 2001
Electronics companies established in 2001
Chinese brands